The 6th Screen Actors Guild Awards, honoring the best achievements in film and television performances for the year 1999, took place on March 12, 2000. The ceremony was held at the Shrine Exposition Center in Los Angeles, California, and was televised live by TNT.

The nominees were announced on February 1, 2000 by Lolita Davidovich and Blair Underwood.

Winners and nominees
Winners are listed first and highlighted in boldface.

Screen Actors Guild Life Achievement Award
 Sidney Poitier

Film

Television

References

External links
 The 6th Annual Screen Actors Guild Awards

1999
1999 film awards
1999 television awards
Screen
Screen Actors Guild
Screen
March 2000 events in the United States